USS Xenia (AKA-51) wa an  in service with the United States Navy from 1945 to 1946. She was then sold to Chile, where she served as Presidente Errazuriz until 1966.

History

U.S. Navy
USS Xenia (AKA-51) was laid down under Maritime Commission contract (MC hull 1912) on 4 May 1945 at Providence, R.I., by the Walsh-Kaiser Co., Inc.; launched on 27 June 1945; sponsored by Mrs. Roger W. Armstrong; and commissioned at the Boston Navy Yard on 28 July 1945. 

Following shakedown, Xenia operated off the east coast with Service Force, Atlantic Fleet, from September 1945 until 17 April 1946, when she reported to the Commandant, 3rd Naval District, New York, N.Y., for disposal.

Chilean Navy
Decommissioned on 13 May 1946, Xenia was struck from the Navy list on 30 November 1946 and subsequently transferred to the government of Chile. Renamed Presidente Errazuriz (named after Federico Errázuriz Echaurren), she served the Chilean Navy, for a time serving as fleet flagship, until 1966. She was sold for partial scrapping by Agencias Metalugicas S.A.C of Chile. A section of the hull was retained by the Chilean Navy for use as a floating jetty.

Name background
The name, Xenia, may be in reference to the asteroid number 625, which was discovered by August Kopff in Heidelberg, Germany, on 11 February 1907. The word Xenia in Greek is a term for hospitality or present. Shortly after the ship was commissioned, the town of Xenia, Ohio demonstrated how well it deserved the name which it shares with the planet and the warship by offering to adopt the attack cargo ship.

References

External links

NavSource Online: AKA-51 Xenia
51 Years of AKAs

 

Artemis-class attack cargo ships
World War II amphibious warfare vessels of the United States
Ships built in Providence, Rhode Island
1945 ships
Auxiliary ships of the Chilean Navy